Albrecht, Duke of Saxe-Eisenach, (Altenburg, 27 July 1599 – Eisenach, 20 December 1644) was a ruler of the duchy of Saxe-Eisenach.  He was the seventh (but fourth surviving) son of Johann, Duke of Saxe-Weimar, and Dorothea Maria of Anhalt.  His regnal name Albert IV derives from the numbering of the duchy of Saxony as a whole, not specifically to the succession in Saxe-Eisenach.

Albrecht received his first instruction from the Field Marshal Frederick of Kospoth. Later he studied at the University of Jena with his brothers.

In the years 1619-1621 he completed his Cavalierstour (Study Tour) with his younger brother Johann Frederick. The two princes travelled to France and Switzerland.

After his return in 1621, Albrecht occupied himself with administrative duties until 1626. He also represented his absent brothers as regent.

In Weimar on 24 June 1633 Albrecht married Dorothea of Saxe-Altenburg, daughter of Frederick William I, Duke of Saxe-Weimar. The marriage was childless.

In accordance with a divisionary treaty concluded with his brothers, Albrecht received Eisenach in 1640. He died four years later, after which his state was merged with Saxe-Weimar under Wilhelm of Saxe-Weimar.

References 
 August Beck: Albrecht, Herzog von Sachsen-Eisenach. In: Allgemeine Deutsche Biographie (ADB). Band 1, Duncker & Humblot, Leipzig 1875, S. 319.

1599 births
1644 deaths
Dukes of Saxe-Eisenach